Baban is a 2018 Indian Marathi-language comedy-drama film directed by Bhaurao Karhade and produced by The Folk Confluence Entertainment Group and Chitraksha Films.

Plot
In an endeavor to convert the traditional business into a big one, ambitious Baban strives hard to fulfill his dreams of prosperity. But the circumstances lead him elsewhere, which in-turn gives rise to a storm.

Cast

 Bhausaheb Shinde
 Gayatri Jadhav
 Shital Chavan 
 Devendra Gaikwad 
 Murnal Kulkarni
 Yashu W Surekha 
 Abhay Chavan
 Sima Samarth
 Suhas Munde
 Dhammadip Kamble

Production 

After the release, Karhade decided to change the end of the film from a strong negative response from audience members.

Soundtrack

Reception

Critical reception 
Ganesh Matkari of Pune Mirror called "The narrative keeps hitting and missing alternately throughout the duration of Baban, finally concluding on an unsatisfactory note". according to lokmat "Baban does not satisfies the audience expectations"

Box office 

References

External links
 

2010s Marathi-language films
2018 films
2018 comedy-drama films
Indian comedy-drama films